Harry Lodge (born 23 September 1967) was a professional English road racing cyclist from Salisbury, Wiltshire. He began cycling with the Chiltern Road Club before becoming a first category rider and gaining a place on the national squad. He was then selected to ride in the team time trial at the 1988 Summer Olympics.

Lodge lived in Italy for 13 years before returning to the UK. In December 2006 he started Halo Sports Management, of which he is managing director. The company distributes Jollywear clothing from Italy. In 2007 and 2008 Lodge managed the British cycling team, KFS Special Vehicles - Sunday Bicycles.

References

External links

WILTSHIRE WITH HARRY LODGE, Cycling Weekly, 6 October 2008

1959 births
Living people
English male cyclists
Cyclists at the 1988 Summer Olympics
Olympic cyclists of Great Britain
Sportspeople from Salisbury